Picaresque is the third studio album from The Decemberists. It was released in 2005 on the Kill Rock Stars record label. The word "picaresque" refers to a form of satirical prose originating in Spain, depicting realistically and often humorously the adventures of a low-born, roguish hero living by their wits in a corrupt society.

Recording
The album was recorded at the Prescott Church in northeast Portland, which the band rented for one month in the summer of 2004. To facilitate the creative process and avoid creative block, band members filled a used bike helmet with slips of paper listing strategies and ideas to try out. Non-traditional rock instruments used in the album's recording included an accordion and a hurdy-gurdy. The album was produced by Chris Walla, also the guitarist for the band Death Cab for Cutie.

Release
The album includes the track "Sixteen Military Wives", the music video of which was distributed by the band via BitTorrent. A double vinyl version was released in the United States that contained the album on the first three sides with an EP of outtakes named Picaresqueties on the fourth side. This EP was the band's final release for the Kill Rock Stars label. In Europe, a single-disc vinyl version was released on Rough Trade without the Picaresqueties EP; the first six tracks appear on Side A, and the final five are on Side B.

A limited edition tenth anniversary pressing of the album on red vinyl was released for Record Store Day 2015. It was formatted as three sides, with the tracks from the Picaresqueties EP as the fourth side.

As of September 2006 it has sold 123,000 units in United States.

Reception

Picaresque has a rating of 81/100 on Metacritic, indicating "universal acclaim." The album reached number 5 on the Billboard Heatseekers chart, and number 128 on the Billboard 200. Pitchfork placed Picaresque at number 143 on their list of top 200 albums of the 2000s.

Track listing
All songs written by Colin Meloy.

Personnel
The Decemberists
 Colin Meloy – lead vocals, rhythm guitar
 Chris Funk – lead guitar, steel guitar, backing vocals
 Jenny Conlee – keyboards, accordion, backing vocals
 Nate Query – bass, backing vocals
 Rachel Blumberg – drums, backing vocals

Additional musicians
 Petra Haden – violin, backing vocals
 Chris Walla – electric guitar
 Paul Brainard – trumpet
 Tom Hill – trombone
 Joe Cunningham – saxophone
 Aaron Stewart – tam-tam
 Jeff London – shofar
 Eric Stern – operatic tenor

Uses in media
The Mad Men episode "Maidenform" opened with a montage set to a segment of the song "The Infanta".

References

External links
 Reviews at Metacritic

The Decemberists albums
2005 albums
Kill Rock Stars albums
Albums produced by Chris Walla